Olangal is a 1982 Indian Malayalam-language film, directed by Balu Mahendra. The film's plot is inspired from novel Man, Woman and Child by Erich Segal.

Plot 
Life goes on happily for the couple, Ravi (Amol Palekar) and Radha (Poornima), who live with their only daughter, until Father John arrives in the city with a young boy Raju, Ravi's son from an affair with Reetha (Ambika), before his marriage to Radha. Now he has to keep the boy with him for a month before Father John takes the boy abroad.

Ravi introduces the boy to his wife as the son of a dead friend, George, and she happily accepts to keep the boy with them. But the truth emerges when the "dead friend" visits their house. The six-year-long marriage between Ravi and Radha shatters.

Cast 
 Amol Palekar... Ravi Chattan
 Poornima Jayaram... Radha R. Chattan – Ravi's wife
 Ambika... Rita
 Anju
 Adoor Bhasi
 T. R. Omana
 Preeta
 Jagathy Sreekumar

Soundtrack 

The song "Thumbi Vaa" gained massive popularity on release. Ilaiyaraaja re-used the tune in Telugu, Tamil and Hindi films. The song was re-used in Balu Mahendra's 1986 Telugu film Nireekshana as "Aakasham Eenatido" and twice in Tamil, first in the 1982 film Auto Raja as "Sangathil Paadatha" and next in Kanne Kalaimaane, the dubbed version of Nireekshana, as "Neerveezhchi Thee Muttuthey". Balu Mahendra loved the tune so much that he insisted having the tune again in his 1996 Hindi film Aur Ek Prem Kahani in the song "Monday To Uth Kar". It was also used in the 2009 Hindi film Paa as "Gumm Summ Gumm".

Reception 
Sreedhar Pillai wrote for India Today, "As always with Mahendra's films the photography is superb. It captures the lush green of Ooty and the urban landscape of Bangalore with equal ease. Amol Palekar gives a subdued performance."

References

External links 
 

1982 films
1980s Malayalam-language films
Films directed by Balu Mahendra
Films based on American novels
Malayalam films remade in other languages
Films scored by Ilaiyaraaja